The Diocese of Manchester  is a Latin Church ecclesiastical territory, or diocese, of the Catholic Church comprising the entire state of New Hampshire in the United States.

It is a suffragan diocese in the ecclesiastical province of the metropolitan Archbishop of Boston, and its bishop is a member of the United States Conference of Catholic Bishops.

Its leading prelate also serves as pastor of the mother church, the Cathedral of St. Joseph in Manchester.

History

1680's to 1880's 
The first Catholics in the British Province of New Hampshire were probably members of the Sokwaki and Pennacook tribes who had been converted by missionaries from New France.  During King William’s War (1689-1697), Native American allies of the French in New Hampshire captured several women from the English colonies in New England. These women later converted to Catholicism; one of them traveled to New France to enter an Ursiline convent. However, there would be no organized Catholic communities in New Hampshire until the 19th century.

Pope Pius VII erected the Diocese of Boston on April 8, 1808, including the new state of New Hampshire in its jurisdiction.The first Catholic church in New Hampshire was built in 1823 in Claremont by a father and son, both Anglican priests, who had converted to Catholicism. The first parish was St. Aloyisius in Dover, erected in 1830. With the industrialization of New Hampshire in the 19th century, many Catholic Irish and French Canadian immigrants started settling there. In 1853, Pope Piux IX erected the Diocese of Portland in Maine, including New Hampshire in its territory.

1884 to 1944 
Pope Leo XIII erected the Diocese of Manchester on April 15, 1884.  He removed New Hampshire from the Diocese of Portland and made it a suffragan of the Archdiocese of Boston.  Leo XIII appointed Reverend Denis Bradley from the Diocese of Portland as the first bishop of Manchester. At some point in the 1880's, Bradley contacted the Benedictine monks at Saint Mary's Abbey in Newark, New Jersey, about creating a Catholic college in New Hampshire.  Saint Anselm College opened in Goffstown, New Hampshire in 1889.

After Bradley's death in late 1903, Pope Pius X appointed Reverend John Delany as the second bishop of Manchester. However, after only 21 months in office, Delany died in 1906. His replacement as bishop was Reverend George Guertin, appointed by Pius X in 1907. Between 1907 and 1926, Guertin added sixteen new parishes in the diocese; five were French-speaking and two were Polish-speaking.  During World War I, Guertin had the diocese purchase a $15,000 war bond;  using his personal funds, he purchase $5 war saving stamps for each student in the cathedral parish school. In September 1930, Guertin decreed that Catholic parents in the diocese must send their children to Catholic schools or be denied absolution.

After Guertin died in 1931, Pope Pius IX appointed Auxiliary Bishop John Peterson from the Archdiocese of Boston as the fourth bishop of Manchester.  A major area of tension in the diocese came from ethnic strife between the Irish and French-Canadian communities.  A French speaker, Peterson told a Manchester dinner audience in 1932 that he condemned all religious and ethnic hatred and would not support any cause based in hatred.  He was able to gain the trust of French Canadian Catholics in the diocese with his words and actions. In April 1934, in the midst of the Great Depression, Peterson enacted austerity spending measures for the diocese.

1944 to 1990 
With the 1944 death of Peterson, Pope Pius XII appointed Bishop Matthew Brady from the Diocese of Burlington to be bishop of Manchester. He presided over a period of unprecedented growth in the diocese, founding 27 parishes in 11 years and authorizing the construction of nearly 50 churches and numerous schools, convents, and other facilities. The number of parishioners increased by 50,000, and the number of priests and religious from around 650 to over 1,600. For all these accomplishments he was nicknamed "Brady the Builder."

Pope John XXIII appointed Reverend Ernest Primeau from the Archdiocese of Chicago as bishop of Manchester in 1958 following Brady's death that year. Primeau founded the first foreign mission of the diocese in 1963 in Cartago, Colombia. During his tenure, the number of Catholics in the diocese increased by 43,000 and the number of parishes by 11; however, weekly mass attendance declined from over 70% to below 50%. Primeau retired as bishop in 1974.

Reverend Odore Gendron was appointed bishop of Manchester by Pope Paul VI in 1974. Gendron created a permanent diaconate in the diocese and joined the New Hampshire Council of Churches. He also founded Magdalen College in Bedford, New Hampshire and Thomas More College of Liberal Arts in Merrimack, New Hampshire. In 1989, Pope John Paul II appointed Auxiliary bishop Leo Edward O'Neil of the Archdiocese of Springfield as coadjutor bishop in Manchester to assist Gendron.

1990 to present 
When Gedron retired in 1990, O'Neil automatically succeeded him as bishop of Manchester. During his tenure, O'Neil worked to foster a common vision among New Hampshire Catholics with a program entitled "Renewing the Covenant." He died in 1997. John Paul II appointed Auxiliary Bishop John McCormack of the Archdiocese of Boston as O'Neil's replacedment in 1998.  He served as bishop until his resignation in 2011. Pope Benedict XVI appointed Auxiliary Bishop Peter Libasci from the Diocese of Rockville Centre as bishop of Manchester.  He is the current serving bishop.

On July 22, 2021, Libasci was named in a lawsuit accusing him of child molestation between 1983 and 1984 when he was parochial vicar at Saints Cyril and Methodius Parish School in New York. The accuser, then 12 or 13 years old, said that Libasci fondled his genitals on "numerous occasions", including one instance when the boy was setting up the altar for mass. The lawsuit also named the Sisters of St. Joseph, the religious order running the school at the time, of neglecting to prevent the abuse. Libasci denied the accusations. On August 29, 2021, the Archdiocese of Boston announced a formal investigation into the accusations. As of February 2023, the investigation is still ongoing

Sexual abuse 
In early 2002, Bishop McCormack publicly announced the names of 14 priests in the diocese who had been accused of sexually abusing children (cf Sexual abuse scandal in Manchester diocese).  In December 2002, the diocese had admitted that its failure to protect children from sexual abuse may have been a violation of criminal law, becoming the first diocese in the United States to do so. Under threat of indictment by the New Hampshire Attorney General, McCormack signed an agreement acknowledging that the Attorney General office possessed evidence sufficient to win convictions as part of the settlement. The diocesan attorney, Ovide M. Lamontagne claimed that McCormack and other prominent church members wanted a speedy settlement and, in an example of behaving "pastorally" rather than as a litigant, instructed their attorneys to take a moderate stance and eschew hardline legal tactics. Lamontagne said of the diocese's legal strategy, "That is not typical in terms of client requests."

Court papers released in January 2003 showed that Bishop Gendron destroyed records of sexual abuse by two different priests during the 1980's.  The first instance was in 1986 for Philip Petit, a diocesan priest who molested a teenager between 1979 and 1981.  Petit left the priesthood in 1986 and Gendron destroyed all of his treatment records at Petit's request.  The second instance happened in 1989, when the Servants of the Paraclete treatment facility in New Mexico requested that Gendron destroy the treatment records of Gordon MacRae, a diocesan priest who was a former patient.  In 1994, McRae was sentenced to 33 to 67 years in state prison for molesting children.

In 2003, the diocese reached a settlement with the New Hampshire Attorney General's Office, The settlement spared the diocese from being criminally charged. In all, in the period of 2002-2003, the diocese agreed to a $15.5 million settlement involving 176 claims of sex abuse. The May 2003 settlement of 61 abuse claims for $6.5 million handled by Manchester attorney Ovide M. Lamontagne as diocese counsel, saved the diocese from criminal prosecution.

A 2003 report by the New Hampshire Attorney General revealed that Gendron helped a priest accused of sexual abuse avoid criminal charges.  In 1975, police in Nashua, New Hampshire arrested Paul Aube, a diocese priest, after find him with a boy in a car, both with their pants down.  Aube, who had admitted to acts of sexual abuse in 1972, confessed his guilt to Gendron.  He asked Gendron to send him for treatment and relieve him of parish duties.  Instead, Gendron called the Nashua police chief to drop charges against Aube.  Gendron then transferred Aube to a parish in Rochester, New Hampshire.  In 1981, the mother of a 15 year old boy discovered Aube having sex with him in the church rectory.  When advised of the new allegation, Gendron did not report Aube to the police.  In 2002, Aube turned himself into New Hampshire state authorities and became a cooperating witness.

In 2004, Leo Landry, a priest convicted of sexually abusing minors, described a meeting that he had with Bishop Primeau in 1967.  A woman had complained to Primeau that Landry had been seen having sex with her 13 year-old son at the family's lakeside camp in Milton, New Hampshire. Primeau summoned Landry to a meeting, in which Landry confessed his guilt.  Primeau told him to stay away from the boy and write a letter of apology to the family.  According to Landry, he never wrote the letter and Primeau never reported him to authorities or removed him from ministry.

On July 31, 2019, the Diocese of New Hampshire released a list of 73 priests and religious order members who were "credibly accused" of committing acts of sexual abuse. Some of those listed were criminally convicted, defrocked, removed from public ministry, or died without receiving punishment.

Statistics 
As per 2018, the diocese pastorally served 322,258 Catholics (24.3% of 1,326,813 total population) on 24,097 km² in 89 parishes with 185 priests (121 diocesan, 38 religious, 26 extern), 73 deacons, 314 lay religious (15 brothers, 299 sisters) and 14 seminarians.

Bishops

Bishops of Manchester 
 Denis Mary Bradley (1883–1904)
 John Bernard Delany (1904–1906)
 George Albert Guertin (1906–1931)
 John Bertram Peterson (1932–1944)
 Matthew Francis Brady (1944–1959)
 Ernest John Primeau (1960–1974)
 Odore Joseph Gendron (1974–1990)
 Leo Edward O'Neil (1990–1997; coadjutor bishop 1989–1990)
 John Brendan McCormack (1998–2011)
 Peter Anthony Libasci (2011–present)

Auxiliary bishops
 Robert Edward Mulvee (1977–1985), appointed Bishop of Wilmington and later Coadjutor Bishop of Providence, subsequently succeeding to bishop
 Joseph John Gerry, O.S.B. (1986–1988), appointed Bishop of Portland
 Francis Joseph Christian (1996–2018)

Other priest of this diocese who became bishop 
 Thomas Michael O'Leary, appointed Bishop of Springfield in Massachusetts in 1921

Parishes 

The parishes in the diocese are as follows:

 All Saints, Charlestown
 Blessed John XXIII, Nashua
 Blessed Sacrament, Manchester
 Christ the King, Concord
 Corpus Christi, Portsmouth
 Divine Mercy, Peterborough
 Gate of Heaven, Lancaster
 Good Shepherd, Berlin
 Holy Cross, Derry
 Holy Family, Gorham
 Holy Rosary, Hooksett
 Holy Trinity, Plymouth
 Immaculate Conception, Nashua
 Immaculate Conception, Penacook
 Immaculate Heart of Mary, Concord
 Mary Queen of Peace, Hinsdale and Winchester
 North American Martyrs, Colebrook
 Our Lady of Fatima, New London
 Our Lady of Lourdes, Pittsfield
 Our Lady of Mercy, Merrimack
 Our Lady of the Cedars (Melkite-Eastern Catholic), Manchester
 Our Lady of the Holy Rosary, Rochester
 Our Lady of the Miraculous Medal, Hampton
 Our Lady of the Mountains, North Conway
 Parish of the Assumption, Dover
 Parish of the Holy Spirit, Keene and Troy
 Parish of the Resurrection, Nashua
 Parish of the Transfiguration, Manchester
 Protection of the Blessed Virgin Mary, (Ukrainian-Eastern Catholic), Manchester
 Sacred Heart, Lebanon
 Sacred Heart, Manchester
 Sacred Heart, Wilton
 Sacred Heart of Jesus, Greenville
 St. Aloysius of Gonzaga, Nashua
 St. André Bessette, Laconia
 St. Anne, Hampstead
 St. Anne-St. Augustin, Manchester
 St. Anthony, Sanbornville
 St. Anthony of Padua, Manchester
 St. Catherine of Siena, Manchester
 St. Catherine of Siena, Woodsville
 St. Charles Borromeo, Meredith
 St. Christopher, Nashua
 St. Denis, Hanover
 St. Elizabeth Seton, Bedford
 St. Francis of Assisi, Litchfield
 St. Hedwig, Manchester
 St. Helena, Enfield
 St. Ignatius of Loyola, Somersworth
 St. John Neumann, Merrimack
 St. John the Baptist, Suncook
 St. Joseph, Belmont
 St. Joseph, Center Ossipee
 St. Joseph, Claremont
 St. Joseph, Epping
 St. Joseph, Lincoln
 St. Joseph, Woodsville
 St. Joseph Cathedral, Manchester
 St. Joseph the Worker, Nashua
 St. Jude, Londonderry
 St. Katharine Drexel, Alton
 St. Kathryn, Hudson
 St. Lawrence, Goffstown
 St. Leo, Gonic
 St. Luke the Evangelist, Plaistow
 St. Marguerite d'Youville, Groveton
 St. Mark the Evangelist, Londonderry
 St. Mary, Claremont
 St. Mary, Hillsborough
 St. Mary, Newmarket
 St. Mary, Rochester
 St. Mary, Rollinsford
 St. Mary of the Assumption, Tilton
 St. Matthew, Windham
 St. Michael, Exeter
 St. Patrick, Hampton
 St. Patrick, Jaffrey
 St. Patrick, Milford
 St. Patrick, Nashua
 St. Patrick, Newport
 St. Patrick, Pelham
 St. Paul, Franklin
 St. Peter, Auburn
 St. Peter, Farmington
 St. Pius X, Manchester
 St. Raphael, Manchester
 St. Rose of Lima, Littleton
 St. Stanislaus, Nashua
 St. Theresa, Henniker
 St. Theresa, Rye Beach
 St. Thomas Aquinas, Derry
 St. Thomas More, Durham
 Ste. Marie, Manchester
 Saints Mary and Joseph, Salem

Catholic education

Superintendents 
 Wilfred J. Lessard (c. 1926)
 Reverend William Collins (1940–1948
 Monsignor George Murray (1960-1972)
 Reverend Joseph P. Duffy (1972–1975)
 Monsignor Thomas S. Hansberry (1975–1976) Interim
 Reverend George J. Soberick (1976–1981)
 Brother. Roger Lemoyne, Brothers of the Sacred Heart (S.C.) (1981–1990)
 Brother Joachim Froehlich, Order of Saint Benedict (O.S.B.) (1990–1991)
 Reverend William T. Garland, Order of Saint Augustine (O.S.A.) (1991–1996)
 Mary Moran (2006–2012)
 Reverend Dennis J. Audet (2012–2013) Interim
 Reverend John R. Fortin, O.S.B. (2013–2016)
 David Thibault (2016- )

High schools 
 Bishop Brady High School, Concord
 Bishop Guertin High School, Nashua
 Holy Family Academy*, Manchester

 Mount Royal Academy, Sunapee
 St. Thomas Aquinas High School, Dover
 Trinity High School, Manchester

Colleges 
 Magdalen College of the Liberal Arts*, Warner
 Rivier University*, Nashua
 Saint Anselm College*, Goffstown
 Thomas More College of Liberal Arts*, Merrimack

 * Schools operated independent of the Diocese

See also 

 Catholic Church by country
 Catholic Church in the United States
 Ecclesiastical Province of Boston
 List of Catholic archdioceses (by country and continent)
 List of Catholic dioceses (alphabetical) (including archdioceses)
 List of Catholic dioceses (structured view) (including archdioceses)
 List of Catholic dioceses in the United States

References

External links

 
 Diocese of Manchester at Catholic-Hierarchy
 Diocese of Manchester at GCatholic.org
 
 Parable - diocesan magazine

 
Christianity in New Hampshire
Manchester, New Hampshire
Manchester
Manchester
Manchester